Ji'an is a prefecture-level city situated in the central region of Jiangxi province of the People's Republic of China while bordering Hunan province to the west. Ji'an lies next to the Luoxiao Mountains with the Gan River running through the middle of the city. Local dialects include a form of Gan Chinese (Jicha subgroup) as well as Hakka Chinese.

It has also formerly been known as Luling and Jizhou.

Administration 

The Ji'an municipal region comprises two districts, a county-level city and ten counties.

District
Jizhou District
Qingyuan District

County-level city
Jinggangshan City

Counties
 Ji'an County
 Jishui County
 Yongxin County
 Anfu County
 Xingan County
 Xiajiang County
 Yongfeng County
 Taihe County
 Wan'an County
 Suichuan County

Geography

Climate 
Ji'an has a humid subtropical climate (Köppen Cfa) affected by the East Asian monsoon, with long, humid, very hot summers and cool and drier winters with occasional cold snaps. With monthly percent possible sunshine ranging from 19% in March to 59% in July, the city receives 1,641 hours of bright sunshine annually. After the heavy rains subside in June, summer is especially sunny. Autumn is warm and relatively dry.

Transportation 
Jinggangshan Airport in Taihe County serves Ji'an. The Beijing-Kowloon Railway line passes through the Ji'an municipality with train stations in Xingan, Xiajiang, Jishui, Ji'an (Ji'an Station), and Taihe. Ji'an is connected to the China National Highways 105 and 319.

Education

Jinggangshan University is located in Qingyuan District, Ji'an.

The Ji'an Public Library, with its main library in Jizhou District, serves the city.

Notable people
Ouyang Xiu, a statesman, historian, poet and essayist of the Song Dynasty.
Ouyang Ziyuan, a cosmochemist, geochemist and space advocate.
Wen Tianxiang, a scholar general, and famed anti-Yuan leader during the latter days of the Southern Song Dynasty.
Yang Wanli, one of the "four masters" of poetry of the Southern Song Dynasty. 
Hu Quan, essayist and one of the four grand ministers of the Southern Song Dynasty. 
Zhou Bida, a left prime minister during the Southern Song Dynasty.
Luo Hongxian, a Ming Dynasty cartographer.
Xiao Gang, former deputy governor of the People's Bank of China.
Liu Zhi, former general of Republic of China.

References

External links 

 
  
 Ji'an Public Library 

 
Cities in Jiangxi
Prefecture-level divisions of Jiangxi